The Open Door is a 2008 American horror/thriller film, directed by Doc Duhame and starring Catherine Munden, Sarah Christine Smith, and Ryan Doom. Munden's character finds her vengeful wishes toward people coming true.

Plot
Anjelica sits at home, angry at being grounded from going to a hip party. She tunes into a legendary pirate radio broadcast, hosted by a strange figure known as the Oracle, that only appears on the nights of the full moon. Angelica wishes ill upon her boyfriend and friends at the party along with her parents, and soon, strange sights and sounds begin, and even stranger things happen to the people around her.

Cast

References

External links

2008 films
2008 horror films
2000s English-language films